Yuanzhou may refer to:

Modern locations
Yuanzhou District, Yichun Jiangxi, named after the historical prefecture
Yuanzhou District, Guyuan Ningxia, named after the historical prefecture
Yuanzhou, Guangdong, a town in Boluo County, Guangdong

Historical locations
Yuanzhou (modern Jiangxi), a prefecture between the 6th and 20th centuries
Yuanzhou (modern Ningxia), a prefecture between the 6th and 13th centuries in modern Ningxia and Gansu
Yuanzhou (modern Liaoning), a prefecture between the 11th and 12th centuries

See also
Yuan (disambiguation)
Wonju, a city in Gangwon, South Korea